Spare ribs (also side ribs or spareribs) are a variety of ribs cut from the lower portion of a pig, specifically the belly and breastbone, behind the shoulder, and include 11 to 13 long bones. There is a covering of meat on top of the bones and also between them.  Spare ribs (pork) are distinguished from short ribs, which are beef.

Pork spare ribs are cooked and eaten in various cuisines around the world. They are especially popular in Chinese and American Chinese cuisine, in which they are generally called paigu, and in the cuisine of the Southern United States.

Preparation

Chinese
In Chinese cuisine, pork spare ribs are generally first cut into  sections, which then may be fried, steamed, or braised.

In the Cantonese cuisine of southern China, spare ribs are generally red in color and roasted with a sweet and savory sauce. This variety of spare ribs is grouped as one of the most common items of siu mei, or Cantonese roasted meat dishes.  In American Chinese cuisine, pork spare ribs are generally cooked in char siu style, and often feature as a part of the appetizer dish called pu pu platter.

Chinese-style spare ribs are usually consumed by gnawing the meat off small bone sections held aloft with chopsticks.

Southern American
Spare ribs are popular in the American South. They are generally cooked on a barbecue grill or on an open fire, and are served as a slab (bones and all) with a sauce.  Due to the extended cooking times required for barbecuing, ribs in restaurants are often prepared first by boiling, parboiling or steaming the rib rack and then finishing it on the grill.

American butchers prepare two cuts:

 Pork spare ribs are taken from the belly side of the pig's rib cage above the sternum (breast bone) and below the back ribs which extend about 6" down from the spine. Spare ribs are flatter than the curved back ribs and contain more bone than meat. There is also quite a bit of fat which can make the ribs more tender than baby back ribs.
 St. Louis Cut ribs are spare ribs in the style of St. Louis-style barbecue, where the sternum bone, cartilage and the surrounding meat known as the rib tips have been removed. St. Louis Cut rib racks are almost rectangular.

Southern-style spare ribs are usually pulled from the whole slab and consumed individually by hand, with the small amount of meat adhering to each bone gnawed off by the eater.

See also

 Prime rib
 Soki

External links 

 Beef Glossary - diagram of various beef cuts, including beef spare ribs

Cantonese cuisine
American Chinese cuisine
Dim sum
Cuts of pork
Cuts of beef
Cuisine of St. Louis
Barbecue